Schuttberg is a German term for a mound made of rubble or out of a rubbish heap.

Many were amassed following the extensive damage from strategic bombing during World War II. These types are more specifically termed Trümmerberg (rubble mountain) and are known colloquially by various namesakes such as Mont Klamott (Mount Rag), Monte Scherbelino (Mount Shard), and Scherbelberg (Shard Mountain). Most major cities in Germany have at least one Schuttberg.

Known Schuttberge

Berlin
The amount of debris in Berlin is about 15 percent of the total rubble in the whole of Germany.

Frankfurt am Main
To remove and recycle the rubble the city authorities in the autumn of 1945 created the non-profit  Trümmerverwertungsgesellschaft which was tasked with removing the rubble and recycling it. Initially the removed rubble was piled up on a rubble mountain called Monte Scherbelino, before the material was recycled and processed to such an extent that by 1964 the pile of rubble had completely disappeared.

Nuremberg
Silberbuck is in the Dutzendteich recreation area and former Reichsparteitagsgelände. The Silbersee is at the base of the disposal. The lake is contaminated with various toxic substances. Although swimming in the water is prohibited, about 50 people have lost their lives in the water since the end of World War II.

Sources

Artificial hills
Hills of Germany